Gravediggaz is an American hip hop group from New York notable for pioneering the horrorcore lyrical style.

Albums

Studio albums

EPs

Compilations

Singles

References

Hip hop discographies